Roberto Dipiazza (born 1 February 1953) is an Italian entrepreneur and politician. A member of the centre-right party Forza Italia, he has been mayor of Muggia between 1996 and 2001 and mayor of Trieste between 2001 and 2011 and again since 2016.

Career
His working career started as a large-scale retail manager before setting up his own business enterprise in Trieste's province. His political debut happened in December 1996 when he was elected Mayor of Muggia as the leader of  a centre-right coalition. His administration claimed to have renovated the old town and to have revived tourism thanks mainly to the new Porto S. Rocco, considered one of the most highly rated yacht clubs in the northern Adriatic Sea, built with international entrepreneurs’ support. He claimed also to have succeeded in improving cross border relations between Italy and Slovenia thanks to the setting up of new business relations between Italian and Slovene multi-utility (gas, water, electricity) companies. In 2000 he was named commendatore (an official title awarded for services given to the Republic of Italy) by President Carlo Azeglio Ciampi.

In May 2001 he was elected Mayor of Trieste with the support of a centre right coalition for a first term. His political program focused on a new role for the city of Trieste linked to the eastern expansion of the European Union, the trade development of the port, the reorganization of the so-called porto vecchio, and the strengthening of the links between the city and its international institutes of advanced studies and applied research. During his first term (2001-2006) as Mayor of Trieste, the merger between Acegas (Trieste) and Aps (Padua) created the biggest multi-utility listed in the stock exchange in the north east of Italy. In 2004 the Italian financial newspaper Il Sole 24 Ore rated Trieste as the best city in Italy for urban quality of life and services. He also supported sports activities and became president of the second division basketball team Pallacanestro Trieste 2004. In the same year (2004) he was named  “grande ufficiale” (another official title awarded for services given to the Republic of Italy) by Carlo Azeglio Ciampi (President in 1999-2006).

In May 2006 he was elected Mayor of Trieste for a second term with the support of a centre right coalition. His program for the new term supported the vision of a city becoming the “capital” of the Adriatic region: a city able to offer qualified services and founding its economical revival on trading and on increased port activities, Trieste's age-old tradition.

His administration claimed to have started a “renaissance” of the city, fuelled by new initiatives in scientific research and by the policy of making Trieste an exclusive centre for tourists, both from Italy and from central eastern European countries. The increase of holiday cruisers calling in Trieste, a result actually achieved by the Autorità portuale (an apolitical port-related institution), and the newly reconversion of the old fish market building into a contemporary art gallery were seen by his supporters as important steps in this direction. The goal to reduce the ICI (a local tax on Real estate) was Dipiazza's priority which implied a strict intervention on public expenses without touching the running of the municipality's administrative structure and services, and it was a matter of debate in the city whether the services were really not touched. Dipiazza left office in 29 May 2011.

As mayor of Trieste he was also in charge as President of the city lyric theatre "Giuseppe Verdi". In April 2013 he was a candidate for regional councilor in Friuli-Venezia Giulia regional election for the list of PDL, the party of Silvio Berlusconi and Angelino Alfano: Dipiazza obtained a very high record of preferences in his constituency and he was elected as regional councilor. In May 2014 he was a candidate of NCD (Angelino Alfano's political party) for the European Parliament, but he was not elected. In June 2016 he was the candidate of FI (Silvio Berlusconi's political party) for the office of Mayor of Trieste with the support of NCD, Brothers of Italy, Northern League and other minor lists of the center right coalition: Dipiazza was elected against Roberto Cosolini (member of PD), the incumbent mayor of Trieste (2011-2016), for a new (the third) term.

References

External links
Trieste's Municipality Official Site

1953 births
Living people
People from Aiello del Friuli
Forza Italia politicians
Mayors of Trieste